Mark John Dean (born October 13, 1967) is an American former competition swimmer and Pan American Games gold medalist.

Dean represented the United States at the 1988 Summer Olympics in Seoul, South Korea, where he competed in the B Final of the men's 200-meter butterfly event, and finished with the ninth-best time overall (2:00.26).  He later won the gold medal in the men's 200-meter butterfly event at the 1991 Pan American Games in Havana, Cuba.

Dean began swimming at the age of 6 and emerged on the international stage under the tutelage of Kansas City Blazers head coach, Pete Malone.  He graduated from the University of California, Los Angeles (UCLA), after competing for coach Ron Ballatore's UCLA Bruins swimming and diving team and earning recognition as an All-American athlete.  He attended law school at St. Louis University, and is now a practicing attorney in St. Louis, Missouri.  He lives in Chesterfield, Missouri with his wife Mary, with whom he had a son and daughter.

See also
 List of University of California, Los Angeles people

References

External links

1967 births
Living people
American male butterfly swimmers
Olympic swimmers of the United States
Pan American Games gold medalists for the United States
Sportspeople from Rockford, Illinois
Swimmers at the 1988 Summer Olympics
Swimmers at the 1991 Pan American Games
UCLA Bruins men's swimmers
Pan American Games medalists in swimming
Medalists at the 1991 Pan American Games